HMS Circe was a  of the British Royal Navy. She was built by Sheerness Dockyard from 1890–1893. She was converted to a minesweeper in 1908–1909 and continued these duties during the First World War. Circe was sold for scrap in 1920.

Design and construction
The Alarms were slightly modified  versions of the previous Sharpshooter-class, with modified engines to improve reliability.

Two triple-expansion steam engines, fed by four locomotive boilers, drove two propeller shafts.

The ship was armed with two 4.7 inch (120 mm) QF guns mounted fore and aft on the ships centreline, backed up by four 3-pounder (47 mm) guns (two in single mounts on the ship's beam and two in casemates forward) and a single Gardner machine gun. Five 14-inch torpedo tubes were fitted (one fixed in the ship's bow and two twin mounts), with three reload torpedoes carried. The ship had a crew of 91.

Circe was laid down at Sheerness Dockyard on 11 January 1891 and launched on 14 June 1892. She reached a speed of  during sea trials and was completed in May 1893 at a cost of £61,979.

Service
In August 1894 Circe took part in that year's Naval Manoeuvres, and in July 1896 again took part in the Manoeuvres, On 26 June 1897 Circe was present at the Jubilee Fleet Review at Spithead. Circe took part in the 1900 Naval Manoeuvres in July that year.

In 1901 Circe was re-engined and had her locomotive boilers replaced by Thornycroft water-tube boilers. Despite these improvement, she was still too slow for effective use against much faster torpedo boats and destroyers. Lieutenant Stewart Ayscough Perry-Ayscough was appointed in command on 31 March 1902, and in October that year she was based at Harwich for fishery duties and as tender to the coast guard ship stationed there. She paid off at Sheerness on 11 December 1902, when her crew transferred to HMS Landrail, while Circe went to Govan to be fitted with new engines and boilers.

Circe was laid up in reserve at Devonport in 1906, and in 1907 recommissioned, joining the Home Fleet. On 30 April 1908 Circe, together with sister ship , several submarines and the submarine depot ship  left Devonport for a cruise to Falmouth. When  suffered problems in her propeller shaft bearings, Circe towed the disabled submarine back to Devonport.

In 1909 Circe was converted to a minesweeper, which involved removing the torpedo tubes. In June 1909 Circe took part in the Fleet manoeuvres.

On the outbreak of the First World War Circe joined the newly established Grand Fleet.  In August 1914, the minesweepers attached to the Grand Fleet, including Circe were employed on carrying out daily sweeps of the Pentland Firth.

On 22 October 1914, as a result of several suspected sightings of submarines in the main fleet anchorage of Scapa Flow, the 1st and 4th Battle Squadrons of the Grand Fleet moved to Lough Swilly on the east coast of Northern Ireland, which was considered more secure against submarine attack. On 27 October, the battleship  struck a mine off Tory Island, north-west of Lough Swilly, and despite efforts to tow her to safety, sank later that day. Circe, which along with sister ship  was already at Lough Swilly, was used to clear a safe channel through the minefield.

On 18 November 1914 Circe and the gunboat  were about to start a minesweeping run in the channel between Fair Island and North Ronaldsay when Skipjacks commanding officer sighted the conning tower of the German submarine U-22. The two gunboats set off at full speed in pursuit, but the submarine outpaced them and dived to safety after a chase of 45 minutes. Speedwell rammed the submarine, which turned over onto her side before disappearing. U-41 had both periscopes damaged and was forced to abort her patrol and return to home.

Circe was a member of the Second Fleet Sweeping Flotilla, based at Scapa Flow as part of the Grand Fleet, in July 1917.

Fate
Circe was sold for scrap on 30 July 1920 to H Auten.

Pennant numbers

References

Bibliography

 

Alarm-class torpedo gunboats
Ships built in Sheerness
1893 ships